John Lewis Williams (born 1940) is a former Australian rugby union player who represented for the Wallabies three times.

Early life
Williams was born on 28 May 1940 in Sydney and attended Newington College (1953–1958). Post-school he became a member of the Drummoyne District Rugby Football Club backline as a winger. He played in the only Drummoyne Grand Final team in 1961 and then switched to Randwick.

Representative career
He played his test matches against South Africa in 1963 and "scored one of the most famous tries in international rugby" when he clinched the Australian victory 11–9 in Johannesburg. Williams claimed a total of three international rugby caps for Australia.

References

Australian rugby union players
Australia international rugby union players
Rugby union wings
Rugby union players from Sydney
1940 births
Living people
People educated at Newington College